Nightmare City (: released in the United States as City of the Walking Dead) is a 1980 science-fiction horror film directed by Umberto Lenzi. The film stars Hugo Stiglitz as a television news reporter who witnesses the collapse of order in a city overrun by irradiated blood-drinking ghouls. Victims of the ghouls rise from the dead to join the host, adding to the chaos.

Plot
American television reporter Dean Miller waits at a small European airport to interview a scientist about a recent nuclear accident, when an unmarked Lockheed C-130 Hercules military plane makes an emergency landing. The plane doors open and dozens of armed, deformed men burst out and attack the military personnel on the runway; they are impervious to most injuries and bullet wounds and are relentless in their assault, stopping only to consume the blood of their victims. Miller flees the airport for the TV station where he works and tries to alert the public, but General Murchison of Civil Defense will not allow it, shutting down the news station and quarantining the news crew to prevent him from doing so. Miller then tries to find his wife Anna, a doctor at the local hospital, as the crazed assailants overrun the city, their ranks swollen by their former victims.

Several zombies attack the TV station, forcing Miller to flee to the hospital. That evening, a group of fiends attack the city's power station, destroying it and plunging the city into darkness. Miller arrives at the hospital as it is being attacked and manages to rescue Anna. They then flee in a stolen ambulance.

Meanwhile, General Murchison meets with military officers and scientists at a hidden bunker where they find the attackers are contaminated humans who have been mutated by radiation. They speculate that the scientist investigating the leak at the state nuclear power plant was apparently infected with radiation and, in turn, infected others aboard the military transport plane, leading to the outbreak. The infected humans are incredibly strong, very fast and have lightning reflexes. However, they are unable to regenerate red blood cells, leading to their appetite for blood, because their lack of drinking blood would result in dehydration, causing their ultimate death by starvation. The only way to kill the infected is by destroying their brain.

Murchison's daughter Jessica and her husband, Bob, are on a holiday getaway in the country, oblivious to the carnage overtaking the city. Murchison sends a pair of officers to locate Jessica and Bob and take them to safety. When they arrive at the couple's campsite, however, they have already been infected and kill Jessica and Bob.

Major Warren Holmes, Murchison's official aide, telephones his wife Sheila, staying at their country house, where he tells her about the crisis and warning her not to leave the house. Sheila is then visited by Cindy, who is oblivious to what is going on. Two infected men break into the house and kill Cindy. Sheila then manages to kill them before they can fully attack her.

The next day, Miller and Anna get out of the city and have to stop at a filling station. There they are attacked by a small group of infected. Miller makes a Molotov cocktail and blows up the zombies, along with the ambulance. The couple continue on foot, trying to evade the zombies who are now roaming the countryside. They take shelter in a local church, only to find an infected priest, who Miller is forced to kill.

Meanwhile, Major Holmes arrives at a local airbase only to find it overrun and leaving the military with no air support. General Murchison keeps in contact with his military units fighting a losing battle against the growing numbers of infected until he decides to bomb the city and kill anyone uninfected who stands in the military’s way. Major Holmes flies to his house to rescue his wife, only to discover that Sheila is also infected, forcing him to kill her.

Miller and Anna escape from the church and arrive at an abandoned amusement park that is also overrun. Arming themselves with sub-machine guns and grenades from dead soldiers, Miller and Anna kill several zombies, but are forced to flee. They climb to the top of a roller coaster to escape when Major Holmes happens to fly by on his way back to Murchison's command post. Holmes lowers a rope from the helicopter, allowing Miller to climb aboard. However, Anna cannot maintain her grip and falls to her death, much to Miller's horror.

Miller then jolts awake, revealing the whole story to have been a dream. He then rushes to meet a scientist at the airport. But when he arrives, a military plane makes an emergency landing, repeating the events of the film's beginning.

Cast

Production
The film was shot on location in Madrid, Spain and in Rome's De Paolis Studios.

Themes
Director Umberto Lenzi felt the film was not to be labeled as a zombie film but a "radiation sickness movie" with hints of an anti-nuclear and anti-military message.

Release
Nightmare City was released in Italy in 1980 and in  Germany on December 19, 1980. It was first released in the United States in 1983 under the title City of the Walking Dead.

Reception
From retrospective reviews, Sight & Sound referred to the film as a "spirited, if preposterous, zombie saga" with a "deeply contrived ending". John Kenneth Muir, in his review of 1980s horror cinema, referred to Nightmare City as a "cobbled together disaster". Muir went on to say it's not the worst zombie film of the 1980s which he felt belonged to Hell of the Living Dead. The assistant professor of Louisiana State University Danny Shipka described the film as "absolutely terrible in every way" as well as referring to poor make-up effects, poor acting and a plot that "makes no sense". In the book Zombie Movies: The Ultimate Guide, a review opined that the film is "way too silly to be taken seriously for even the briefest moments" and that it is "not a good movie, but it is a ridiculously good guilty pleasure with some genuine surprises".  In The Zombie Movie Encyclopedia, academic Peter Dendle wrote that the film is "at the best of moments, a forced and pointless test of endurance". Dendle described the zombies as "utterly unconvincing".

Remake
Fangoria announced in 2015 that Tom Savini would be directing a remake of the film. The project raised over $138,000 from fans via Indiegogo and projected a 2016 filming start; however, as of July 2019, the film has not gone into production.

See also
List of horror films of 1980
List of Italian films of 1980
List of zombie films

Notes

References

 
 
 Muir, John Kenneth. Horror films of the 1980s. McFarland, 2007. .

External links 
 
 

1980 films
1980 horror films
1980s science fiction horror films
Italian zombie films
Vampires in film
Films directed by Umberto Lenzi
Italian science fiction horror films
Spanish science fiction horror films
Films set in Rome
Films shot in Madrid
Apocalyptic films
Films scored by Stelvio Cipriani
1980s Italian films